Johnny Frank Garrett (December 24, 1963 – February 11, 1992) was a death row prisoner executed by the State of Texas.

Murder of Benz
Garrett was accused of the murder of a Catholic nun that took place on October 31, 1981, when he was 17 years old. According to the prosecution, that morning, Garrett raped, strangled, and killed 76-year-old Sister Tadea Benz in the St. Francis Convent. On November 9, 1981, Garrett, who lived across the street from the convent, was arrested.

Trial and execution
Garrett was tried and convicted of the crime. He was held at Ellis Unit, north of Huntsville, Texas, which at the time held men on the State of Texas's death row. He was originally scheduled to be executed on January 6, 1992, but after Pope John Paul II asked for clemency, Governor of Texas Ann Richards gave him a temporary reprieve. After Richards's reprieve, the Texas Board of Pardons and Paroles held a hearing on whether Garrett should receive a commutation to life in prison but the death sentence was retained by a 17 to 1 vote. He was examined by Dr. Dorothy Otnow Lewis, who determined he had multiple personalities as a result of child abuse from his mother, grandmother, and grandfather. He was ultimately executed at age 28 at Huntsville Unit on February 11, 1992 by lethal injection.

His final meal request was ice cream. 
The TDCJ website has stated since at least 2012 that "this offender declined to make a last statement." However, there are last words of Garrett reported from the time of execution re-quoted frequently, and reported by APBnews as: "I'd like to thank my family for loving me and taking care of me. The rest of the world can kiss my ass."

Director Jesse Quackenbush, a man from Albany, New York who graduated from the University of Houston Law School in 1987 and, that year, moved to Amarillo, made the documentary The Last Word which argues that Garrett was in fact innocent of the crime. He argued that Garrett was the victim of overzealous prosecutors and poor defense attorneys. It was adapted into the semi-fictional horror film Johnny Frank Garrett's Last Word.

See also
 Capital punishment for juveniles in the United States
 Capital punishment in Texas
 Capital punishment in the United States
 List of people executed in Texas, 1990–1999
 List of wrongful convictions in the United States
 Roper v. Simmons: 2005 U.S. Supreme Court ruling that the execution of those under 18 (at the time of committing the capital crime) is unconstitutional.
 Thompson v. Oklahoma: 1988 U.S. Supreme Court ruling that the execution of those who committed their crime when under the age of 16 is unconstitutional.
 Wrongful executions in the United States

References

 

1963 births
1992 deaths
1981 murders in the United States
20th-century executions by Texas
American people executed for murder
People convicted of murder by Texas
People executed by Texas by lethal injection
People from Amarillo, Texas
Juvenile offenders executed by the United States